Onychauxis presents with thickened nails without deformity, and this simple thickening may be the result of trauma, acromegaly, Darier's disease, psoriasis, or pityriasis rubra pilaris, or, in some cases, hereditary.

See also 
 Onycholysis
 List of cutaneous conditions

References

External links 

 

Conditions of the skin appendages